Neopolyptychus choveti is a moth of the  family Sphingidae. It is known from Cameroon.

The wingspan is 25–32 mm for males.

References

Neopolyptychus
Moths described in 2004